Rubirizi, sometimes spelled Rubiriizi, is a town in Rubirizi District, Ankole sub-region, Western Uganda. The town is the main municipal, administrative and commercial center of Rubirizi District. The district is named after the town.

Location
Rubirizi lies just south of the Equator, along the Kikorongo–Ishaka Road. The coordinates of the town are: 00°15'58.0"S, 30°06'25.0"E (Latitude:-0.266111; Longitude:30.106944).

Population
The 2014 population census, enumerated the population of Rubirizi Town at 8,204. In 2015, the population of the own was projected at 8,300 people. In 2020, the mid-year population of the town was projected at 9,100 people. It was calculated that the population of the town grew at an average annual rate of 1.9 percent between 2015 and 2020.

Points of interest
The following points of interest are found within the town limits or close to its edges: (a) The headquarters of Rubirizi District Administration (b) The offices of Rubirizi Town Council (c) Rubirizi Central Market: The largest fresh-produce market in the town (d) The Ntungamo-Kasese Highway: The highway passes through the town in a general north to south direction and (e) A branch of Bank of Africa Uganda.

See also

References

External links
 Rubirizi District Internet Portal
 Rubirizi District Is Nature's Paradise As of 9 September 2013.

Populated places in Western Region, Uganda
Cities in the Great Rift Valley
Rubirizi District